The Padamañjari is an 11th-century commentary on the Kashikavritti, a commentary on Pāṇini. It is attributed to Haradatta, who is also the author of a commentary on the Apastamba Dharmasutra, the Gautama Dharmasutra and other texts.

References
Patrick Olivelle, Language, texts, and society: explorations in ancient Indian culture and religion, Firenze University Press, 2005, 301 ff.

11th-century Indian books
Medieval Sanskrit grammarians